The Iraqi Institute for Economic Reform (IIER) is a non-profit, non-governmental research institute based in Baghdad, Iraq.

Founded in 2004, IIER seeks to stimulate debate about economic reform policy in Iraq by organizing monthly public policy seminars in the  Al-Rasheed Hotel in Baghdad.

IIER's public policy seminar overview on the transparency of Iraq's federal budget was published in the Global Arab Network.

References

Economy of Iraq
Economic reforms